In mathematics, Wirtinger's representation and projection theorem is a theorem proved by Wilhelm Wirtinger in 1932 in connection with some problems of approximation theory.

Wirtinger's paper  contains the following theorem presented also in Joseph L. Walsh's well-known monograph

(p. 150) with a different proof.

 where  is the area element, then the unique function  of the holomorphic subclass , such that is least, is given by

 

This is an analog of the well-known Cauchy integral formula with the square of the Cauchy kernel. Later, after the 1950s, a degree of the Cauchy kernel was called reproducing kernel, and the notation  became common for the class .

 

and also to some Hilbert spaces of entire functions.

See also

References

Theorems in complex analysis
Theorems in functional analysis
Theorems in approximation theory